TP53 target 3D is a protein that in humans is encoded by the TP53TG3D gene.

References

Further reading